In the magnetosphere, the plasma sheet is a sheet-like region of denser (0.3-0.5 ions/cm3 versus 0.01-0.02 in the lobes) hot plasma and lower magnetic field near the equatorial plane, between the magnetosphere's north and south lobes.

A magnetosphere is produced by the interaction of a stream of charged particles, such as solar wind, with the magnetic field of a planet (or similar body). All planets with intrinsic magnetic fields, including Earth, are surrounded by a magnetosphere.

References

Geomagnetism
Planetary science
Space plasmas